Hair Battle Spectacular is an American reality competition series that aired on Oxygen from August 10, 2010, to October 3, 2011. The series features ten hair stylists as they compete for a $100,000 grand prize and to see who can create the most outrageous hair styles that resemble everything from multilayer wedding cakes to toys with movable pieces.

Cast
Brooke Burns, Host — Season 1
Eva Marcille, Host — Season 2
 Derek J, Judge — Hair designer
 Taylor Jacobson, Judge — Stylist

Season 1

Eliminated
Josh 'Roo' Wixom – Hometown: Las Vegas, Nevada
Keleigh 'Malibu' Laier – Hometown: Laguna Niguel, California (Left due to medical reasons)
Bryson 'Boss' Conley – Hometown: Los Angeles, California
Tara 'Cajmonet' Merritt  – Hometown: Woodland Hills, California
Jerome 'J-Rok' Allen – Hometown: Atlanta, Georgia
Valerie 'Valley Girl' St. George – Hometown: Burbank, California
Sexi Lexi Hopper — Hometown: Denver, Colorado
Moira 'Fingaz' Frazier – Hometown: Toledo, Ohio
Nate 'Tsunami' Siam  – Hometown: Modesto, California (Runner-up)

Winner
 Jasmaine 'Minista' Jazz  – Hometown: Brooklyn, New York

Progress

12345 Two contestants with the same numbers indicates that they faced off in a battle that week.
 The contestant withdrew from the competition due to medical reasons.
 The contestant lost their hair battle, was a "Hair Don't", and was eliminated from the competition.
 The contestant lost their hair battle and was a "Hair Don't".
 The contestant lost their hair battle and was a "Hair Don't" and was also in the bottom 2.
 The contestant won their hair battle and was a "Hair Do" but did not win the challenge.
 The contestant won their hair battle and was a "Hair Do" and won the challenge.
 The contestant won Hair Battle Spectacular.

Season 2

Eliminated
Dnise "Bronx" Brown – Hometown: Bronx, New York
Kristin "Dimples" Jackson – Hometown: Brooklyn, New York
Spencer "Camouflage" Lebowitz – Hometown: Redondo Beach, California
Gabriel "GQ" Quiñones -Hometown: La Puente, California
Brenda "MzH20" Waters – Hometown: Atlanta, Georgia
Tyler "Atomic" True – Hometown: Los Angeles, California
Bethany "Queen B" Bell — Hometown: Los Angeles, California
Jeanine "J9" Calia — Hometown: Providence, Rhode Island
Alessandro "Bossa Nova" Voce – Hometown: Beverly Hills, California
Ashley "Blondie" Stone — Hometown: Newington, Connecticut

Winner
 Kirby "Nostradamus" Keomysay — Hometown: Omaha, Nebraska

Progress

12345 Two contestants with the same numbers indicates that they faced off in a battle that week.
 The contestant withdrew from the competition due to medical reasons.
 The contestant lost their hair battle, was a "Hair Don't", and was eliminated from the competition.
 The contestant lost their hair battle and was a "Hair Don't".
 The contestant lost their hair battle and was a "Hair Don't" and was also in the bottom 2.
 The contestant won their hair battle and was a "Hair Do" but did not win the challenge.
 The contestant won their hair battle and was a "Hair Do" and won the challenge.
 The contestant won Hair Battle Spectacular.

References

External links
 

2010s American reality television series
2010 American television series debuts
2011 American television series endings
English-language television shows
Oxygen (TV channel) original programming